Si on avait besoin d'une cinquième saison (If We Needed a Fifth Season), also known as Les Cinq Saisons (The Five Seasons), is the second studio album by French-Canadian progressive rock band Harmonium, released on 15 April 1975 by PolyGram. The album marked a departure from the folk rock sound of the band's self-titled debut album towards a unique progressive rock sound, and also marked the growth of the band, as members Serge Fiori, Michel Normandeau and Louis Valois were joined by Pierre Daigneault and Serge Locat.

Si on avait besoin d'une cinquième saison is regarded as "one of the best transitional albums ever recorded and an essential item in Québec's music history". It was nominated for the Juno Award for Best Selling Album in 1976 and was ranked at 56 in music journalist Bob Mersereau's The Top 100 Canadian Albums. In 2015, Rolling Stone placed it 36th in its list of the 50 best progressive rock albums of all time.

The album revolves around a seasonal concept; the first four songs each represent one of the traditional four seasons, respectively spring, summer, autumn, and winter, while the final track, "Histoires sans paroles", represents the imaginary fifth season. Some lyrics on this album, like on Depuis l'automne, show the separatist ideology shared by the band at that time.

The band was supported by Marie Bernard playing the Ondes Martenot, as well as the voice of Judi Richards in "Histoires sans paroles".

Track listing

Side one 
 "Vert" (Michel Normandeau, Serge Fiori) – 5:35
 "Dixie" (Serge Fiori) – 3:26
 "Depuis l'automne" (Serge Fiori, Michel Normandeau) – 10:28

Side two 
 "En pleine face" (Serge Fiori) – 4:50
 "Histoires sans paroles" (Serge Fiori) – 17:12
 "L'isolement"
 "L'appel"
 "La rencontre"
 "L'union"
 "Le grand bal"

Personnel
Serge Fiori – guitar, lead vocals, percussion
Michel Normandeau – guitar, vocals
Louis Valois – bass guitar, electric piano
Pierre Daigneault – flutes, clarinets
Serge Locat – keyboards

Charts

Certifications

References

1975 albums
Concept albums
Harmonium (band) albums